Parmanand Deepchand Hinduja (1900–1971) was an Indian businessman, the founder of the Hinduja Group.

Career
Hinduja was of Sindhi origin. Hinduja was responsible for establishing trading links between India and Persia (now Iran) in 1919.

He founded the P.D. Hinduja National Hospital and Medical Research Centre in Mumbai, and the Hinduja Foundation.

Personal life
He married Jamuna Parmanand Hinduja, and they had five sons:
Girdhar Hinduja (1930–1963), who later married Lalita Girdhar Hinduja
Srichand Parmanand Hinduja (born 1935)
Gopichand Hinduja (born 1940)
Prakash Hinduja (born 1945) 
Ashok Hinduja (born 1950)

References

1900 births
1971 deaths
Parmanand
Businesspeople from Mumbai
Sindhi people